In geometry and crystallography, a glide plane (or transflection) is a symmetry operation describing how a reflection in a plane, followed by a translation parallel with that plane, may leave the crystal unchanged.

Glide planes are noted by a, b or c, depending on which axis the glide is along. If the axis is not defined, then the glide plane may be noted by g. When the glide plane is parallel to the screen, these planes may be indicated by a bent arrow in which the arrowhead indicates the direction of the glide. When the glide plane is perpendicular to the screen, these planes can be represented either by dashed lines when the glide is parallel to the plane of the screen or dotted lines when the glide is perpendicular to the plane of the screen. Additionally, a centered lattice can cause a glide plane to exist in two directions at the same time. This type of glide plane may be indicated by a bent arrow with an arrowhead on both sides when the glide plan is parallel to the plane of the screen or a dashed and double-dotted line when the glide plane is perpendicular to the plane of the screen. There is also the n glide, which is a glide along the half of a diagonal of a face, and the d glide, which is along a fourth of either a face or space diagonal of the unit cell . The latter is often called the diamond glide plane as it features in the diamond structure. The n glide plane may be indicated by diagonal arrow when it is parallel to the plane of the screen or a dashed-dotted line when the glide plane is perpendicular to the plane of the screen. A d glide plane may be indicated by a diagonal half-arrow if the glide plane is parallel to the plane of the screen or a dashed-dotted line with arrows if the glide plane is perpendicular to the plane of the screen. If a d glide plane is present in a crystal system, then that crystal must have a centered lattice.

Formal treatment
In geometry, a glide plane operation is a type of isometry of the Euclidean space: the combination of a reflection in a plane and a translation in that plane. Reversing the order of combining gives the same result. Depending on context, we may consider a reflection a special case, where the translation vector is the zero vector.

The combination of a reflection in a plane and a translation in a perpendicular direction is a reflection in a parallel plane. However, a glide plane operation with a nonzero translation vector in the plane cannot be reduced like that. Thus the effect of a reflection combined with any translation is a glide plane operation in the general sense, with as special case just a reflection. The glide plane operation in the strict sense and the pure reflection are two of the four kinds of indirect isometries in 3D.

The isometry group generated by just a glide plane operation is an infinite cyclic group. Combining two equal glide plane operations gives a pure translation with a translation vector that is twice that of the glide plane operation, so the even powers of the glide plane operation form a translation group.

In the case of glide plane symmetry, the symmetry group of an object contains a glide plane operation, and hence the group generated by it. For any symmetry group containing glide plane symmetry, the translation vector of any glide plane operation is one half of an element of the translation group. If the translation vector of a glide plane operation is itself an element of the translation group, then the corresponding glide plane symmetry reduces to a combination of reflection symmetry and translational symmetry.

See also lattice.

See also
Space group
Glide reflection

References

 

Crystallography
Symmetry